Mesoa, or Messoa (Μεσσόα), was a settlement that existed before the Dorian conquest. It was united with three other such settlements (Pitane, Limnae, and Cynosura) by a common sacrifice to Artemis, and eventually coalesced into ancient Sparta. It is probable that Mesoa was in the southeast part of the city.

Its site is unlocated.

References

Populated places in ancient Laconia
Former populated places in Greece
Lost ancient cities and towns
Sparta